Huacrachuco District is one of three districts of the province Marañón in Peru.

References